Menangle is a village in the Macarthur region of New South Wales, Australia.

Location
Menangle is part of the Wollondilly Shire.

History
The town's name is derived from an Indigenous Australian word for 'a place of swamps and lagoons'.

In 1806, Walter Davidson named his land grant in this district "Manangle". This property was later incorporated into the larger Macarthur Estate and the village grew to service the operations of Camden Park Estate.

The opening of the railway in 1863 enabled overnight milk deliveries to the Sydney Market.

In connection with the construction of Sydney Harbour Bridge, a tramway was constructed between the railway station and a sand-mining area on the banks of the Nepean River. However, this tramway is not currently in service.

Heritage listings 
Menangle has a number of heritage-listed sites, including:
 Main Southern railway: Menangle railway station
 Main Southern railway: Nepean River railway bridge, Menangle

Notable people
Albert Stephen Stanner, was a Churchwarden from 1895 to 1924 at the St James Anglican church.  One of the church's stained glass windows commemorates him.
The Rubens, an Australian band and Triple J Hottest 100 finalist for 2012 & winners in 2015, comprising three brothers and one childhood friend, who all grew up in Menangle.
James Tedesco, Sydney Roosters captain and fullback grew up in Menangle. 
Jessica Cronje, a wheelchair basketball player.

Menangle railway bridge

The Menangle railway bridge is the oldest surviving rail bridge in New South Wales, and was built under the direction of John Whitton. The following description was published in 1864, at the time it was opened.  The bridge carries the Main South Line over the Nepean River, linking Menangle Park and Menangle.

'The tubular girder bridge at Menangle is the most extensive engineering work that has been executed on any of our railways, and much admiration has been expressed of the practical skill with which it has been designed and carried out.

It was at first intended that the bridge at Menangle should be of stone or brick piers, with wrought-iron girders; but in consequence of what was considered too high a price for the ironwork Mr Whitton recommended a change in the design and drawings were made for a timber bridge. The drawings were about being prepared, when, in February, 1860, disastrous floods occurred, and the raising of the river five feet higher than it had ever before risen, necessitated the preparation of fresh designs in order to raise the bridge seven feet. Shortly afterwards, however, the Government being able to come to terms with Mr Willcox the original plan was carried out, and drawings were prepared for a tubular iron girder bridge, upon stone piers. The ironwork was made at Sir Morton Peto and Co.'s factory at Birkenhead; and shipped in two vessels at Liverpool. One of the vessels, containing the ironwork for the first and third spans, was wrecked shortly after leaving the Mersey; but the loss was immediately replaced, and in a little over six months from the date of fixing the first portion of the ironwork the bridge was finished.

The approaches for distance of 980 feet on the northern side, and 440 feet on the southern, are of timber in bays of four upright and two battering piles, secured by wallings and bracings, with openings of twenty-five feet ; the ballast and permanent way is laid on planking, resting on double longitudinal girders with traverse joists.

The iron girders rest on four oval stone piers of eighty feet by twenty feet at the base, tapering off to fifty-two by twelve, with vertical openings and surmounted by an impost course. The whole of the stone used in their construction was obtained from a sandstone quarry about a mile distant.

The foundation of three of the piers rests on the bed rock; the fourth, that nearest to the Southern bank, on piles and concrete borings to a depth of sixty-five feet having failed to give indications of a more secure basis. The total distance between the extreme piers is 486 feet, which is spanned by two longitudinal girders, each twelve and a half feet high and twenty-five feet apart, with kelson girders every three feet, having their ends rivetted to the bottom boxes. The girders are surmounted by a roadway composed of ironbark planking, on which the rails are laid; the height between the roadway and the ordinary level of the river is sixty-five feet. The total cost of the viaduct was about £80,000. Nearly 1000 tons of iron and 80,000 cubic feet of timber have been used in its construction and everything that engineering skill could devise has been done to give stability to the work : the most severe tests that could be applied have produced a deflection of only six-tenths of an inch.'

In 2003, there were concerns for the structural soundness of the Viaduct.

Menangle village today

The village is serviced by the Menangle railway station. The station is on the NSW TrainLink Southern Highlands line.

Menangle has several heritage-listed buildings. These include Camden Park House, The Menangle Store, the Rotolactor, Gilbulla, The Pines, Menangle railway station, and the Menangle Railway Viaduct.

Menangle has two churches, St James Anglican and St Patrick's Catholic Church. Both churches are Heritage Listed. St Patrick's is 'a typical example of a "Simplified Gothic Revival" country church of its time.' St James (1876–1896) 'has historical significance through its links with the Macarthur-Onslow family of "Camden Park" and "Gilbulla", and its associations with two leading architects, John Horbury Hunt and Sir John Sulman.'

The primary school has been closed for more than twenty years and is awaiting restoration.

The village's population was expanded in the 1990s with the release of Camden Park Land to Westcoast developers. A Development Control plan was created to manage the heritage of the village.  Until this time, water was pumped from the Nepean River; however, in 1992 the developers provided a new water supply.

References

Further reading
 Hawkey, Vera. 1976. A history of St. James Church of England, Menangle, 1876-1976.  [Camden, N.S.W.] : [Anglican Parish of St. John]. 
 Menangle School 90th. Anniversary : souvenir book (1961)
 Menangle Underbridge Assessment : Review of Damage State Library of NSW. Retrieved June 2010.
 Moloney, J. J. 1929. Early Menangle.  Newcastle, N.S.W. : The Australasian Society of Patriots, Dally [i.e. Dalley] Branch.
 Willams, Ken. 2009. Along the Menangle Road : a concise history of the land grants on Menangle Road between Menangle Bridge and the junction with Picton Road.  Picton and District Historical and Family History Society.

External links
 Menangle Community Website
 Durham Green Retirement Village, Menangle
 Elizabeth Macarthur Agricultural Institute
 1930s photo of Gilbulla
 Menangle House history
 St James Church history
 St Patrick's church history
 Historic photo exhibition Macarthur Chronicle June, 2010
 Image of viaduct, in 1884, from State Library of NSW
 Gilbulla Conference Centre
 Menangle Virus, 1997

Menangle Gallery

Towns in New South Wales
Wollondilly Shire